The  is a series of compact sports coupés and hot hatches which were produced by Toyota from 1972 to 2000. The name Trueno in Spanish means thunder. In Japan, the Sprinter Trueno was exclusive to Toyota Auto Store locations, later renamed Toyota Vista Store in 1980.

The name Levin in Old English means lightning. In Japan, the Corolla Levin was exclusive to Toyota Corolla Store locations. 



TE27 Series (1972–1974)

The first generation of the Corolla Levin and Sprinter Trueno models in early 1972 were the high performance models of Corolla and Sprinter 2-door fastback coupé. They were powered by the 1.6 liter engines mated to a 5 speed manual transmission, borrowed from the Toyota Celica 1600GT. The inspiration came from Toyota manager Geisuke Kubo who wanted to offer something similar to the Alfa Romeo Giula Junior. The Sprinter Trueno J had the 2T-B OHV with twin down draft carburettors. The other Levins and Truenos used the 2T-G (high compression) or 2T-GR (low compression) DOHC engines with two double venturi side draft Mikuni carburettors. Vehicles installed with the 1.6 litre engine obligated Japanese owners to pay more annual road tax.

TE37, TE47, TE51, TE55, TE61, TE62 & TE65 Series (1974–1979)

With the second generation of the Corolla Levin and Sprinter Trueno in 1974 there was a clearer difference between the two through design. Though based on the same shell the whole nose design differed totally with the Levin (TE51 and TE55) having an aggressive forward raked design while the Trueno (TE47, TE61, TE62 and TE65) had a sleeker and more curved design.
In contrast to its predecessor this second generation of Levin and Trueno was offered with a much wider array of engines and trim. The Trueno LT grade used the plain 2T engine and the Trueno ST grade used the twin downdraft carburettors 2T-B engine.

AE71/TE71/TE72/TE75 Series (1979–1983)

The third generation of the Corolla Levin and Sprinter Trueno was released in 1979. While the sporty Corollas and Sprinters were available in 2-door sedan, 2-door hardtop, 3-door coupé and 3-door liftback body styles, the Corolla Levin and Sprinter Trueno were only produced as a 3-door coupé (TE71). Trim levels for the Japanese models were Base, S, and GT-APEX, all with the 2T-G engine.

AE85/86 Series (1983–1987)

The fourth generation of the Corolla Levin and Sprinter Trueno was released in 1983 and was offered in 2-door coupé and 3-door liftback body styles. It was the last in the series to use the front-engine, rear-wheel drive layout, carried over from the previous generation. In this generation, the Corolla Levin came with fixed rectangular headlights, while the Sprinter Trueno distinguished itself from the Corolla Levin with its retractable pop-up headlights. The American Corolla SR-5 and GT-S had the same front-end as the Japanese Trueno, complete with retractable headlights, although it had different and longer bumpers in the front and rear so as to meet US federal standards. European Corolla GTs had the same front-end as the Corolla Levin.

Engine
4A-GEU (16 valve): AE86 GT, GT-APEX, GT-V Models
4A-GEC (16 valve): AE86 Corolla GT-S Model
4A-C (8 valve): AE86 Corolla SR-5 Model
3A-U (8 valve): AE85 SR, SE, GL, XL Models

AE91/92 Series (1987–1991)

The fifth generation of the Corolla Levin and Sprinter Trueno was introduced in 1987, and had several changes from the previous generation. Gone was the front-engine, rear-wheel drive (FR) layout of the previous generation, and in its place was the more conventional front-engine, front-wheel drive (FF) layout as with other Corollas of the same generation. The 3-door liftback body style was also dropped, leaving with the 2-door coupé, 4-door sedan, 3-door hatchback, and 5-door liftback body styles, each with different designations respectively. 

As with the previous AE85/AE86 models of the preceding generation, it had two different front end styles for each models. The Sprinter Trueno had a much more slanted front fascia with retractable pop-up headlights, while the Corolla Levin had a much more leveled hood line, and had fixed rectangular headlights. New to the sporty coupés was the supercharged "GT-Z" trim, which was the highest and fastest trim level of the AE92 at the time. The Zi and Xi were separate models, with the Zi exclusive to the Levin and the Xi exclusive to the Trueno. The female-oriented GL-Lime and XL-Lissé models of the AE85 were carried over to the AE91 series and were renamed to just Lime and Lissé, whilst retaining their same purpose. The Lime and Lissé were the luxury variants of the L trim, featuring unique upholstery, power steering, and an automatic transmission, among others. The Lime was the Levin, while the Lissé was the Trueno. All cars came with either a 5-speed manual or a 4-speed automatic. On the GT-APEX model, a digital cluster similar to the one found in the AE86 GT-APEX models was also offered as a factory option.

There were two major changes to the car that happened between 1987 to 1991. The early models, known as the "Zenki" (前期) generation, were introduced in 1987. The 4A-GE engines in this generation were late "bigport" versions, denoted by the red-and-black lettering on the cam covers. These engines (aside from the 4A-GZE) retained the T-VIS intake system from the early "bigport" versions found in the previous AE86 models, among other minor changes. Other distinct features on the Zenki models included different front bumpers for the Levin's front end, having a different design with a small upper grille that extends to both ends of the bumper. The Trueno had a front bumper design similar to the preceding facelifted AE86, and had combo lights near the headlights and bumpers.

In 1989, the model received a minor facelift and changes in engine performance, also known as the "Kouki" (後期) generation. Major rework was done to the 4A-GE engine, replacing the twin-runner T-VIS intake system with a single-runner intake featuring smaller intake ports, hence the nickname "smallport". These engines are denoted by the all-red lettering found in the cam covers. The minor tweaks also upped the compression ratio from 9.4:1 to 10.3:1 (NA models) and from 8:1 to 8.9:1 (supercharged models). The trim grades were also revised, doing away with the GT-V and L trims of the AE92 and AE91, respectively, while the AE91 Zi and Xi trims became the ZS and XS. The carbureted 5A-F engine was no longer offered during this generation, therefore eliminating all carbureted engines from the lineup. As with the previous Zi and Xi trims, the ZS was exclusive to the Levin while the XS was exclusive to the Trueno. The front bumper of the Levin now had a shorter upper grille that did not extend to both ends, with two side markers on each corner. The Trueno also carried this change as well, differing with larger combo lights above the bumper and below the headlights.

For the US-market, the GT-S and SR-5 AE92 coupés came in the same configuration as with the prior AE86 models, being based on the Trueno with retractable headlights. Like the previous generation, it had longer bumpers in the front and rear so as to satisfy US federal regulations. Other differences include the use of a MAF sensor on US-market engines as opposed to a MAP sensor on Japanese-market engines.

Engine

Note: All are 16-valve engines.
4A-GZE (Supercharged): AE92 GT-Z Model
4A-GE: AE92 GT, GT-APEX, GT-V, Corolla GT-S Models
4A-F: AE92 Corolla SR-5 Model
5A-FHE: AE91 ZS, XS (facelift) Models
5A-FE: AE91 Zi, Xi (pre-facelift), G, Lime, Lissé (facelift) Models
5A-F: AE91 G, L, Lime, Lissé (pre-facelift) Models

AE100/101 Series (1991–1995)

The Corolla Levin and Sprinter Trueno underwent a full design change in June 1991 with the sixth generation models, based on the E100 series. Japanese F1 driver Ukyo Katayama was appointed as the image representative for marketing as he was popular in Japan at the time. A commercial was broadcast in which Katayama runs a Levin on the Mine circuit with the catchphrase "Ukyo, Levins".

Developed during the peak of the Japanese asset price bubble, the latest technologies in body, chassis, engine, transmission and safety were put into the new E100 series. Consequently, the body size increased to the maximum width the Japanese government regulations would allow and became heavier, which made it less attractive as a sports compact model than previous generations. 

The series continued the same tradition of offering two separate styles and names, sold in different brand dealers in Japan. Unlike previous generations, the E100 Levin and Trueno coupés were not officially offered elsewhere, making these models exclusive to Japan. After last using them in the E90 series, the early-to-late 80's trend of using retractable pop-up headlights for the Trueno have started to become phased out in the early 90's, and so they were replaced with fixed headlights similar to the Levin but in the style of the combo lights from the previous generation so as to make way for a more modern, rounder, aerodynamic and luxury styling.

The chassis was all new, with a much higher, rigid body that would be carried over to the next generation E110. Sharing the same wheelbase as the Corolla sedans, the suspension featured re-tuned front and rear MacPherson struts. The biggest improvement, however, was the high-performance 4A-GE engine. Many of the parts were redesigned, with the intake side camshaft now having Toyota's Variable Valve Timing or VVT (a precursor to the later VVT-i with a discontinuous variable valve timing mechanism), and used a five-valve-per-cylinder head design (three inlet, two exhaust) for a total of 20 valves. This was seen as revolutionary at that time as Yamaha Motor Corporation, who typically collaborated with Toyota to produce their high-performance engines, were actively using five-valve-per-cylinder designs in their racing motorcycles. The valve covers have been redesigned in tandem with a new cylinder head, featuring silver cam covers with chrome lettering, hence the name "Silver Top". In addition, it was equipped with individual throttle bodies to increase engine throttle response, which was rare for a commercial vehicle of its class. A MAF sensor was used instead of a MAP sensor, however, unlike with the 16-valve "smallport" version of the 4A-GE. Because of this, it requires the use of a plenum. The supercharged 4A-GZE engine still kept the same 16-valve head as with previous versions, however, but it did have many changes to the engine internals. It produced  at 6400 rpm. The trim grades were also revised, simplifying the lineup. The female-oriented Lime/Lissé trim grade was dropped.

Super Strut Suspension, a revolutionary Toyota technology, was standard for GT-Z. The GT-Z was equipped with a viscous limited-slip differential as standard equipment. The GT-APEX, which only offered Super Strut Suspension as an option, has an electronically controlled suspension called TEMS (upper and lower G-sensitive type) as optional equipment.

Engine
4A-GZE (16 valve, supercharged): GT-Z Model
4A-GE (20 valve) "Silver Top": GT, GT-APEX Models
4A-FE (16 valve): SJ Model
5A-FE (16 valve): S Model

AE110/111 series (1995–2000)

The seventh and final generation of the Corolla Levin and Sprinter Trueno was introduced in 1995. This is the last series to use the Sprinter Trueno name, and the last to be offered as a sport compact coupé. It shared the same platform as its predecessor. The first models (known as Zenki) were manufactured from 1995 to 1997, with the facelifted models (known as Kouki) manufactured from 1997 to 2000. The series continued to use different styles for the Levin and Trueno, however by 1997 the front fascia would be changed to a more subtle design that is near identical to each other.

New trim levels were introduced, replacing the S, SJ, GT and GT-APEX trims of the previous generation. These are FZ, XZ, BZ-V, BZ-G and BZ-R. Initially, the lineup consisted of the FZ, XZ, BZ-V and BZ-G trims. The low-priced FZ featured the 1.5 L 5A-FE engine, the XZ featured the 1.6 L 4A-FE engine, and the BZ-V, BZ-G and BZ-R all featured the 20-valve 4A-GE engine. The 4A-GE in this generation was updated with revised internals, the replacement of a MAF sensor with a MAP sensor, and a new valve cover, this time in black, hence the name "Black Top". The supercharged GT-Z trim with the 4A-GZE engine is dropped. The lineup would be refreshed one final time in 1997, dropping the BZ-V trim while adding the new BZ-R trim. The BZ-R trim featured a 6-speed manual transmission, LSD, bigger front rotors, ABS, improved calipers, a taller rear spoiler and Super Strut Suspension (SS), all of which could be added to the BZ-G and BZ-V models as factory options. Additionally, a set of Recaro SR3 (confetti pattern) seats could be installed as a factory option.

With the discontinuation of the Toyota Sprinter brand in 2000, the Trueno name was retired, and the 5-door hatchback Toyota Allex from the E120 series replaced the Sprinters. As for the Corolla Levin, it remained in production alongside the Trueno until it too was retired in 2000, with the introduction of the E120 series that same year.

Engine
4A-GE (20 valve) "Black Top": BZ-V, BZ-G, BZ-R Models
4A-FE (16 valve): XZ Model
5A-FE (16 valve): FZ Model

Other uses of "Levin" name 
The name "Levin" was later reused for the Corolla hatchback in Australia and New Zealand, where certain trim levels had the Levin label.

In China, the  models of E180 and E210 Corollas are sold under the Levin/Levin GT names.

See also
Toyota AE85
Toyota AE86
Toyota Corolla
Toyota Sprinter

References

Levin 1
Sprinter Trueno